The Sixth Asian Science Camp, which began on 26 August 2012, was hosted by Israel and took place in Jerusalem.  The Asian Science Camp (ASC), developed by two Nobel Prize recipients  and based on the Lindau meetings, is an annual forum described as an event "to enlighten science-talented youths in Asia through discussions with world scholars, as well as to promote international friendship and cooperation young Asian students."  Approximately 300 Asian students from twenty-two Asian countries attended the event.

Students
In terms of the number of participants, the Sixth Asian Science Camp is the largest of all the previous camps.

Twenty-two Asian countries sent students from high schools and colleges to the event. The Israeli delegation was the largest (35 participants), followed by China (34 participants), India (33 participants), and Japan (24 participants). In addition, students from Australia, Taiwan, South Korea, Nepal, New Zealand, the Philippines, Singapore, Sri Lanka, Thailand, Turkey, Vietnam, Georgia, Armenia, Turkmenistan, and Myanmar attended. Approximately 300 Asian students attended in total.

The Israeli Foreign Ministry stated that the ministry wanted to ensure that Israel would be able to host the event, and was working for months in this pursuit.  The ministry said that the organizers of the Sixth Asian Science Camp expressed an interest in having Israel host the event, and that "many people in Asia... are curious about Israel’s successes in high-tech and science."  The foreign ministry described the Sixth Asian Science Camp as "an important project, one that was one of our top goals for 2012, a special year in which Israel is emphasizing its relations with Asian countries."

Nobel Prize recipients
Ten Nobel Prize recipients were invited to lecture at the event. Among these recipients are Robert Aumann (economics), Aaron Ciechanover (chemistry), Makoto Kobayashi (physics), Roger D. Kornberg (chemistry), and Yuan T. Lee (chemistry).

Event
The Asian Science Camp took place at the Givat Ram campus of the Hebrew University in Jerusalem. Lectures and discussions by five Nobel Prize recipients, as well as over 20 leading scientists, were held at the event.  The discussions by these scientists involved a diverse range of fields, including biology, physics, genetics, mathematics, and space travel.

Students at the Sixth Asian Science Camp also took part in a creative poster competition, and went on trips to Israeli tourist sites, Israeli university laboratories, various high-tech companies, and social gatherings.

The slogan for the Sixth Asian Science Camp was "Young Science for the Future."

See also 
 Asian Science Camp 2016
 Asian Science Camp 2022

References

Science events
Youth conferences
Youth science
2012 in education
2012 in science